Eagle Shadow Mountain Solar Farm is a planned 420 MWp (300 MWAC) photovoltaic power station north of Las Vegas, Clark County, Nevada on the Moapa River Indian Reservation.
The facility is being developed by 8minutenergy Renewables and when completed will be the largest photovoltaic system on tribal lands in North America. It is also the largest component within NV Energy's current tranche of renewable energy projects that will create over 1 Gigawatt of new electricity supply. 

The electricity generated will have a flat rate of $23.76 per megawatt-hour throughout its 25-year power purchase agreement (PPA) term,  which could establish a new record-low rate for a solar PPA contract.

The project is also part of NV Energy’s plans to retire a 254 MW coal-fired unit in a power-constrained region of Nevada at the end of 2021, four years ahead of schedule.

See also 

Moapa Southern Paiute Solar Project
Solar power in Nevada
Renewable energy in the United States
List of photovoltaic power stations

References 

Solar power stations in Nevada
Buildings and structures in Clark County, Nevada
Photovoltaic power stations in the United States